#dogpoopgirl is a 2021 Romanian comedy-drama film directed by Andrei Huțuleac, starring Andreea Gramosteanu, Coca Bloos, Paul Chiribuță, Tudor Istodor and Cezar Antal. The film is loosely based on dog poop girl.

Cast
 Andreea Gramosteanu as Aline
 Coca Bloos
 Paul Chiribuță
 Tudor Istodor
 Cezar Antal
 Andrei Huțuleac

Release
The film premiered at the Moscow International Film Festival on 25 April 2021, where it won the top award at the festival, the Golden George.

Reception
Ştefan Dobroiu of  wrote that the film "efficiently nudges the viewer towards a useful comparison".

Allan Hunter of Screen Daily wrote that the film "gleefully scatters its concerns a little too far and wide", while Gramosteanu "convincingly conveys the bewilderment and exasperation of someone who finds it impossible to convince others that she is not the monster they think."

References

External links
 
 

Romanian comedy-drama films
2021 comedy-drama films